Taieri is a parliamentary electorate in the Otago region of New Zealand, initially from 1866 to 1911, and was later recreated during the 2019/20 electoral redistribution ahead of the 2020 election.

Population centres

First incarnation
In the 1865 electoral redistribution, the House of Representatives focussed its review of electorates to South Island electorates only, as the Central Otago Gold Rush had caused significant population growth, and a redistribution of the existing population. Fifteen additional South Island electorates were created, including Taieri, and the number of Members of Parliament was increased by 13 to 70.

This electorate was based on the town of Mosgiel.

Second incarnation
The seat was recreated for the 2020 general election by renaming the electorate of Dunedin South and amending its borders, particularly with a large area around the Clutha River and South Otago added from Clutha-Southland. This is due to a rate of population growth below the South Island average in Dunedin that means it can no longer fully support two electorates. The current electorate of Taieri has an area stretching from South Dunedin to Balclutha.

The previous electorate of Dunedin South had been held by the Labour Party since its creation in 1996, and specifically by Clare Curran since 2008. However, the new boundaries for Taieri include more rural areas, and Curran announced in 2019 that she would not be seeking reelection in 2020.

History

The Taieri electorate was first established for the 1866 general election for the 4th New Zealand Parliament.

Donald Reid was the first representative. He resigned in 1869 and was succeeded by Henry Howorth. Reid was re-elected at the 1871 general election, and elected unopposed in the 1875 general election that was held on 29 December. Reid resigned once again in 1878, and was succeeded by William Cutten. Reid's son, also called Donald Reid, represented the electorate 1902–08.

All other members retired at the end of their representation. When the electorate was abolished in 1911, Thomas Mackenzie stood successfully for Egmont.

Members of Parliament
Taieri has been represented by eight Members of Parliament:

Key

Election results

2020 election

1899 election

1890 election

1878 by-election

1869 by-election

Notes

References

New Zealand electorates
1865 establishments in New Zealand
1911 disestablishments in New Zealand
2020 establishments in New Zealand